Upshur County is a county in the U.S. state of West Virginia. As of the 2020 census, the population was 23,816. Its county seat is Buckhannon. The county was formed in 1851 from Randolph, Barbour, and Lewis counties and named for Abel Parker Upshur, a distinguished statesman and jurist of Virginia. Upshur served as United States Secretary of State and Secretary of the Navy under President John Tyler.

Geography
The county falls within the United States National Radio Quiet Zone. The highest elevation in Upshur County is 3,160 feet, near Sugar Run on the Randolph and Upshur County lines just outside Palace Valley and Hemlock. It is reported there as an elevation marker at the site.

In 1863, West Virginia's counties were divided into civil townships, with the intention of encouraging local government.  This proved impractical in the heavily rural state, and in 1872 the townships were converted into magisterial districts.  Upshur County was divided into six districts: Banks, Buckhannon, Meade, Union, Warren, and Washington.  In the 1990s, the six historic magisterial districts were consolidated into three new districts: First, Second, and Third.

Major highways
  U.S. Highway 33
  U.S. Highway 48
  U.S. Highway 119
  West Virginia Route 4
  West Virginia Route 20

Adjacent counties
 Harrison County (north)
 Barbour County (northeast)
 Randolph County (southeast)
 Webster County (south)
 Lewis County (west)

Demographics

2020 census 
As of the 2020 census, there were 23,816 people and 9,599 households residing in the county. There were 11,178 housing units in Upshur County. The racial makeup of the city was 94.4% White, 0.9% African American, 0.7% Asian, 0.2% Native American, 0.6% from other races, and 3.8% from two or more races. Hispanics or Latinos of any race were 1.3% of the population.

There were 26,143 households, of which  44.8% were married couples living together, 28% had a female householder with no spouse present,19.5% had a male householder with no spouse present. The average household and family size was 2.94. The median age in the county was 41.9 years with 20.8% of the population under 18. The median income for a household in the city was $44,470 and the poverty rate was 20%.

2010 census
As of the 2010 United States census, there were 24,254 people, 9,619 households, and 6,528 families living in the county. The racial makeup of the county was 97.6% white, 0.7% black or African American, 0.4% Asian, 0.2% American Indian, 0.2% from other races, and 1.0% from two or more races. Those of Hispanic or Latino origin made up 1.0% of the population. In terms of ancestry, 18.1% were German, 13.8% were American, 10.6% were Irish, and 8.6% were English.

Of the 9,619 households, 28.7% had children under the age of 18 living with them, 54.0% were married couples living together, 9.6% had a female householder with no husband present, 32.1% were non-families, and 26.9% of all households were made up of individuals. The average household size was 2.40 and the average family size was 2.88. The median age was 40.9 years.

The median income for a household in the county was $36,114 and the median income for a family was $44,937. Males had a median income of $36,517 versus $25,420 for females. The per capita income for the county was $18,823. About 14.1% of families and 19.3% of the population were below the poverty line, including 26.7% of those under age 18 and 14.1% of those age 65 or over.

2000 census 
As of the census of 2000, there were 24,254 people, 9,619 households, and 6,528 families living in the county. The population density was 68.4 people per square mile (25/km2). There were 11,099 housing units at an average density of 31.3 per square mile (12/km2). The racial makeup of the county was 97.6% White, 0.7% Black or African American, 0.2% Native American, 0.2% Asian, 0.2% from other races, and 1% from two or more races. 1% of the population were Hispanic or Latino of any race.

There were 9,619 households, out of which 28.7% had children under the age of 18 living with them, 54% were married couples living together, 9.6% had a female householder with no husband present, and 32.1% were non-families. 26.9% of all households were made up of individuals, and 12.2% had someone living alone who was 65 years of age or older. The average household size was 2.4 and the average family size was 2.88.

In the county, the population was spread out, with 24.7% from age 0 to 19, 7.60% from 20 to 24, 22.6% from 25 to 44, 28.3% from 45 to 64, and 16.6% who were 65 years of age or older. The median age was 41 years. For every 100 females there were 97 males.

The median income for a household in the county was $39,381, whereas the median income for families was 44,937 . Males had a median income of $36,517 versus $25,420 for females. The per capita income for the county was $19,498. About 14.1% of families and 19.3% of the population were below the poverty line, including 26.7% of those under age 18 and 14.1% of those age 65 or over.

Communities

City
 Buckhannon (county seat)

Magisterial districts

Current
 First
 Second
 Third

Historic
Upshur County was divided into six townships on July 31, 1863.  They were replaced in the 1990s.
 Banks District, named for Nathaniel Prentiss Banks
 Buckhannon District, named for the county seat, the City of Buckhannon
 Meade District, named for General George Gordon Meade
 Union District, named for military soldiers serving the Union cause
 Warren District, named for Gouverneur Kemble Warren
 Washington District, named for President George Washington

Unincorporated communities

 Abbott
 Adrian
 Alexander
 Alton
 Arlington
 Atlas
 Beans Mill
 Canaan
 Carter
 Craddock
 Daysville
 Deanville
 Eden
 Ellamore
 Evergreen
 Excelsior
 Five Forks
 Freeman
 French Creek
 Frenchton
 Gaines
 Gale
 Goodwin
 Gormley
 Goshen
 Gould
 Hampton
 Heavener Grove
 Hemlock
 Hinkleville
 Hodgesville
 Holly Grove
 Hoover Town
 Imperial
 Ingo
 Ivy
 Kanawha Head
 Kedron
 Kesling Mill
 Lorentz
 McCuetown
 Midvale
 Nebo
 Newlonton
 Overhill
 Palace Valley
 Post Mill
 Queens
 Red Rock
 Reger
 Rock Cave
 Rocky Ford
 Ruraldale
 Sago
 Sand Run
 Selbyville
 Shahan
 South Buckhannon
 Swamp Run
 Tallmansville
 Tenmile
 Tennerton
 Teter
 Vegan
 White Oak
 Wilsontown
 Yokum
 Zion

Politics
Whereas most of West Virginia has seen a rapid and continuing shift to the Republican Party since the 1990s as a result of Democratic environmental and immigration politics, Upshur County—though strongly Democratic during the Second Party System—has ever since statehood been a Republican stronghold due to its powerful Unionist sympathies from Civil War days, and the association of the Democratic Party with the “Slave Power” and creating a war the yeoman residents had no desire to fight. The solitary post-Civil War Democrat to win the county has been Lyndon Johnson in 1964, and he won by only 168 votes. Since 1896, only two other Democrats—Jimmy Carter in 1976 and Bill Clinton in 1996—have topped forty percent in the county.

Economy
Economy includes coal mining and timber, as well as higher education—the Upshur County seat of Buckhannon is home to the small, private, liberal arts institution West Virginia Wesleyan College. The West Virginia State Wildlife Center in French Creek also generates some income as a popular tourist attraction. Upshur County also gained international attention during the Sago Mine disaster in 2006; the blast and ensuing aftermath trapped 13 coal mining for nearly two days, only one of whom survived.

See also
 National Register of Historic Places listings in Upshur County, West Virginia
 Sago Mine disaster
 West Virginia Wesleyan College
 West Virginia State Wildlife Center

References

External links
 Buckhannon-Upshur Chamber of Commerce
 Upshur County Board of Education
 Upshur County Development Authority
 Upshur County Public Library
 Upshur County Historical Society
 The Record Delta newspaper
 West Virginia Strawberry Festival
 Upshur County WVGenWeb

 
1851 establishments in Virginia
Populated places established in 1851
Counties of Appalachia